Lidio Andrés Feliz (born 26 June 1997) is a sprinter from the Dominican Republic. He won the silver medal for the mixed 4 x 400 metres relay at the 2020 Tokyo Olympics, and a gold at the 2022 World Athletics Championships.

Achievements

International competitions

References

External links
 

1997 births
Living people
Dominican Republic male sprinters
Athletes (track and field) at the 2020 Summer Olympics
Olympic athletes of the Dominican Republic
People from Barahona Province
Olympic silver medalists for the Dominican Republic
Olympic silver medalists in athletics (track and field)
Medalists at the 2020 Summer Olympics
20th-century Dominican Republic people
21st-century Dominican Republic people
World Athletics Championships winners
World Athletics Championships athletes for the Dominican Republic